Norm Tivendale (born 2 October 1955) is  a former Australian rules footballer who played with Footscray in the Victorian Football League (VFL).

Notes

External links 		
		
		
				
		
Living people		
1955 births		
		
Australian rules footballers from Victoria (Australia)		
Western Bulldogs players